Walking in the Rain may refer to:

 "Walking in the Rain" (Flash and the Pan song), 1978, covered by Grace Jones
 "Walking in the Rain" (The Ronettes song), 1964
 "Walking in the Rain" (Modern Romance song), 1983
 "Walking in the Rain", a single by Chancellor and Younha, 2020

See also
 "The Rain" (Oran "Juice" Jones song)
 Just Walkin' in the Rain, Johnnie Ray song